Posht Tang-e Sofla Seyyed Reza (also Romanized as Posht Tang-e Soflá Seyyed Rez̤ā) is a village in Tarhan-e Sharqi Rural District, Tarhan District, Kuhdasht County, Lorestan Province, Iran. At the 2006 census, its population was 180, in 36 families.

References 

Towns and villages in Kuhdasht County